
Year 286 (CCLXXXVI) was a common year starting on Friday (link will display the full calendar) of the Julian calendar. At the time, it was known as the Year of the Consulship of Maximus and Aquilinus (or, less frequently, year 1039 Ab urbe condita). The denomination 286 for this year has been used since the early medieval period, when the Anno Domini calendar era became the prevalent method in Europe for naming years.

Events 
 By place 

 Roman Empire 
 Winter/Spring: The Caesar Maximian defeats the Bagaudae rebellion in Gaul. He then defeats a Germanic invasion into Gaul, defeating an army of Burgundians and Alemanni and another army of Chaibones and Heruli.
 Emperor Diocletian campaigns successfully against Sarmatian raids. The future emperor Constantius defeats the 'Bosporian Sarmatians'.
 April 1 – Diocletian rewards Maximian by elevating him to co-emperor, giving him the title Augustus. 
 Summer: Carausius, commander of the Classis Britannica, is accused of piracy by Maximian and is sentenced to death. He responds by declaring himself emperor of Britain and Northwestern Gaul. His forces consist of the newly built Roman fleet and three legions in Britain. The Carausian Revolt is supported by Gaulish merchant ships and Frankish mercenaries.

 Asia 
 Tuoba Chuo succeeds his brother Tuoba Xilu as chieftain of the Tuoba clan.
 Chaekgye becomes king of the Korean kingdom of Baekje.

Births

Deaths 
 Crispin and Crispinian, Roman cobblers and martyrs
 Domnina of Anazarbus, Christian martyr and saint
 Mark and Marcellian, Christian martyrs (approximate date)
 Tuoba Xilu, chieftain of the Tuoba clan (modern Mongolia)

References